The Spanish national cricket team is the team that represents Spain in international cricket. They became an affiliate member of the International Cricket Council (ICC) in 1992 and an associate member in 2017. They made their international debut in the ECC Trophy in 2001, finishing in 6th place. They played in the tournament again in 2001, this time finishing seventh. In the equivalent tournament in 2005, the European Affiliates Championship, they put in a much improved performance to finish in third, just missing out on promotion to Division Two of the European Championship. They played in Division Three of that tournament in 2007 and will play in Division Three once again in 2009.

In April 2018, the ICC decided to grant full Twenty20 International (T20I) status to all its members. Therefore, all Twenty20 matches played between Spain and other ICC members after 1 January 2019 will be a full T20I.

History 

Cricket is first recorded as being played in Spain in the year 1809 by soldiers of General Lord Wellesley (later the Duke of Wellington). During the Peninsular War the soldiers played the game in and around Ciudad Rodrigo, Lugo and Orense. There are many records of the game being played by visiting British land and sea forces, either among themselves or against local British expatriate communities.

The game entered a new era in Spain with the founding of Madrid Cricket Club in 1975. It was based at first on British and Indian players, but soon West Indian and Spanish members joined.

In June 1989, a National Executive Committee was formed and the first steps were taken to unify all of the cricket playing clubs in Spain.

2018-Present
In April 2018, the ICC decided to grant full Twenty20 International (T20I) status to all its members. Therefore, all Twenty20 matches played between Spain and other ICC members after 1 January 2019 will be a full T20I.

Spain played its first ever T20I against Malta on 29 March 2019, during the 2019 Spain Triangular T20I Series. The match was played at La Manga Club, Murcia, Spain.

First International Tournament (ECC Trophy/ICC Europe Championships) 

Spain played their first tournament in 2001 in Austria. It was the ECC Trophy 2001. They also played their first match of their international cricket history in that tournament. They were in the Seebern Group amongst 2 groups. In their group there were Portugal, Malta, Finland and Sweden. Every match of the tournament was 35 overs. They played their first match at 13 August 2001 match in Seebarn Cricket Centre No 1 Ground, Lower Austria against Portugal. After winning the toss Portugal came down to bat and scored 229/6 in 35 overs. Opener Nadeem Butt scored 69. But due to their slow overrate Spain could play 32 overs. In 32 overs Portugal made 166/7. G Howe made 40 the highest score of Spain's innings. Portuguese bowler Bagvanadaia made 3/19 in 4 overs. So Spain lost their 1st international match against Portugal by 63 runs. Spain's next matches was against Finland. It was on 14 August 2001 at Seebarn Cricket Centre No. 2 Ground, Lower Austria. After winning toss Spain came down to bat. They made 222/3 in 35 overs. Batsman G Howe made 103 which was the highest of Spain's innings. Finish bowler Scott Thurling took 2/36 in 7 overs. In bowling Spain smashed their opponent Finland. Finland could make 141/9 in 35 overs. Scott Thurling made highest 43 in Finland's innings. G Howe took 3/29 in 7 overs. Spain got a victory of 81 runs and got their first win in international cricket.

Grounds

Tournament history

European Cricket Championship 
2001: 6th place
2003: 7th place

European Affiliates Championship 
2005: 3rd place

ICC Europe Division 3 Championship 
2007: Runners-up
2009:  3rd place

Iberia Cup 
2019: Winners

Current squad

This lists all the players who have played for Spain in the past 12 months or has been part of the latest T20I squad. Updated as of 26 February 2023.

Head Coach 
Corey Leigh Rutgers (born 28 May 1989 in Footscray, Victoria) is a former WA country and grade cricketer who played in Western Australia. Rutgers is current coach of the Spanish national cricket team, Assistant Coach for Islamabad United PSL franchise and Pakhtoon T10 franchise.

From 2017-18 he previously worked for the Netherlands team as an Assistant & Analyst coach.

In August 2019, Rutgers was appointed head coach of the Belgium national cricket team.

On 14 December 2019, Rutgers was named as head coach of Falcon Hunters T10 franchise in the inaugural Qatar T10 league. Falcon Hunters went on to lift the championship.  

In November 2021, Rutgers signed with the Espana National cricket federation as head coach.

Records and Statistics 

International Match Summary — Spain
 
Last updated 26 February 2023

Twenty20 International 
 Highest team total: 206/2 v Malta, 30 March 2019 at La Manga Club, Murcia
 Highest individual score: 102*, Awais Ahmed v Malta, 30 March 2019 at La Manga Club, Murcia
 Best individual bowling figures: 5/11, Lorne Burns v Guernsey, 30 April 2022 at Desert Springs Cricket Ground, Almería

Most T20I runs for Spain

Most T20I wickets for Spain

T20I record versus other nations

Records complete to T20I #2005. Last updated 26 February 2023.

See also
 List of Spain Twenty20 International cricketers

References

Spain in ICC's Official Site
ECC Trophy 2001

External links
 
 ICC profile

Cricket in Spain
National cricket teams
Cricket
Spain in international cricket